Saint-Flour (Auvergnat: Sant Flor) is a commune in the Cantal department in the Auvergne region in south-central France, around 100 km south of Clermont-Ferrand. Its inhabitants are called Sanflorains.

Geography 

The upper city (ville haute) of Saint-Flour is located on the abrupt volcanic dike Planèze, the lower city (ville basse or "Faubourg") extends on the banks of the Ander.

History
There are numerous dolmens in the neighborhood and scattered traces of Bronze Age occupation.  Roman occupation is signalled by two Roman villas of middling importance, one near the railroad station, the other a modest Augustan-age villa near the hamlet of Roueyre, part of Saint-Flour. The Roman name of this small vicus was Indiciacum or Indiciacus, which evolved into Indiciat in the sub-Roman period, a reference to the landmark of Planèze.

Middle Ages
Early, perhaps as early as the fifth century,<ref>Marcellin Boudet's estimated date (Boudet, La Source Minérale Gallo-Romaine de Coren Et Son Trsor; "the traditions of Saint Florus (Flour)...have been the subject of numerous discussions" (Catholic Encyclopedia, s.v. "Saint-Flour")</ref> Florus of Lodève, credited in medieval tradition with being the first bishop of Lodève and belonging to the apostolic era, arrived to Christianize the valley, and gave his name to the area, striking a rock with his staff, it was said, to create a holy spring that continued to be venerated under its Christianized guise, into the 20th century.

The present town called Indiciac took shape only around the millennium, clustered around the monastery founded on the high rock in 996, at first little more than an oratory. The site, already occupied by a small monastic community, was donated to Odilo of Cluny by the Auvergnat seigneur, Astorg de Brezons; the donation was confirmed by Pope Gregory V, i.e. in 996–99, but Astorg's nephew, Amblard "le mal Hiverné" ("the furious"), the comptour  perhaps asserting residual family interests in the place, seized it and laid it waste, sparing the church. Astorg and Amblard together then donated it to St Peter's, but Amblard reconsidered and erected a fortress in the ruins of the monastery, but, seized with remorse, donated it once more to Odilo of Cluny.
Urban II, following the Council of Clermont (1095) consecrated the new abbey church, which received a triple dedication reflecting local tradition and present affiliations: Saint-Sauveur, Saint Pierre and Saint Flour.

The diocese of Saint-Flour was established in August 1317 by the Avignon pope, John XXII.

French Revolution
During the French Revolution, the commune took several dechristianized successive names, Fort-Cantal'l, Fort-Libre and Mont-Flour. It returned to its ancient historic designation in the An II'' (1793). The territory of the commune was never changed. Briefly, between 1790 and 1795, it served as the préfecture, of the newly-created département, before Aurillac had succeeded to that position.

Population

The famous troubadour Bernart Amoros recalled to his readers that he came from Saint-Flour:
Eu Bernartz Amoros clerges scriptors daquest libre si fui d'Alvergna don son estat maint bon trobador, e fui d'una villa que a nom Saint Flor de Planeza
The tragic poet Pierre-Laurent Buirette de Belloy (1727–95), author of a once-celebrated tragedy on the Siege of Calais, was born at Saint-Flour.

École d'Eté de Probabilités
The annual École d'Eté de Probabilités de Saint-Flour has resulted in a series of volumes concerning probability theory. Founded in 1971, the summer school is sponsored by Clermont Auvergne University, the European Mathematical Society, and CNRS.

Monuments
 Saint-Flour Cathedral : Gothic cathedral of the 15th century. You can discover a black Christ, stained-glass windows presenting the history of Florus, the Frescoes of Hell and Purgatory, and organs.
 Notre-Dame Collegiale : Gothic style. dating from the 14th century, served as a hall for the grain trade in the 19th century. It was rehabilitated between 2005 and 2008 : since an impressive rose window attracts all eyes, designed by the sculptor Francesco Marino Di Teana, who also realizes the bronze door and all stained glass.
 Saint Vincent Church : Gothic style. The church reflects the importance of religion in the Middle Ages in Saint-Flour and was a privileged place in the city, testify its various uses : convent of the Jacobins, then court, Masonic temple and monastery of the Visitation. The Saint Vincent Church has been listed as a Historic Monument since 1960. Frescoes of great historical importance dating from the 15th century were discovered by Yves Morvan, a specialist in medieval wall paintings. These frescoes depicting Saint Anna are a tribute by the Dominicans to the mother of the Virgin Mary.

Gallery

See also
 Roman Catholic Diocese of Saint-Flour
 Saint-Flour Cathedral

References

External links

 Tourism office website
 Picture of Saint-Flour Cathedral
 

Communes of Cantal
Subprefectures in France
Auvergne